Created by the Delaware & Hudson Railway (D&H) in 1881, the Napierville Junction Railway (NJR) was the D&H subsidiary in Canada. Its purpose was to provide the easiest and fastest line with minimal grades from Rouses Point, NY, to a point near Montreal (St. Constant Jct, QC, now Delson, QC), selected for its good connections to both of the city's main passenger terminals. Until the end of September 1917, the D&H used the connection over the Grand Trunk Railway's Victoria Bridge into Bonaventure Station. At Delson a junction also exists with the Canadian Pacific Railway (CPR) via the St. Lawrence Bridge into Windsor Station, used by the D&H from October 1, 1917 until the end of passenger service in 1971, and by Amtrak's Adirondack between 1974 and 1986.

At its opposite end at Rouses Point, NY, the railway continued onto the D&H's Canadian Main line toward Schenectady, NY.

Operation

Starting in 1967, the Napierville Junction Railway had two MLW RS-2 locomotives and 4 cabooses which served to pull consists from Upper New York State to Montreal, QC. For clearing the train crew through customs and passengers, the Lacolle railway station in Lacolle, Quebec, (7 miles from the NY state border) served as the stop for the NJR. From customs to maintenance this was the NJR's operating office, which then led to the Delaware and Hudson headquarters in Albany, NY. In 1971, the NJR's days were numbered when the D&H merged the NJR back into one entity. This continued to operate like this until the early 1990s when the D&H was bought and merged into the Canadian Pacific Railway thus turning the Rouses Point to Delson line into Canadian Pacific's Lacolle Sub.

Post-1971 operation
Although the entire NJR route is still in service, very few traces of its Napierville Junction Railway heritage remain. One of their brown cabooses is displayed in Mooers, New York. Their locomotives were repainted as D&H in the 1970s.

See also
Napierville, Quebec

References

External links

Rail transport in Quebec
Railway companies established in 1881
Railway companies disestablished in 1971
Defunct New York (state) railroads
Delaware and Hudson Railway
Canadian companies established in 1881